Stillman Drake (December 24, 1910 – October 6, 1993) was a Canadian historian of science best known for his work on Galileo Galilei (1569–1642). Drake published over 131 books, articles, and book chapters on Galileo. Including his translations, Drake wrote 16 books on Galileo and contributed to 15 others.

Career
Drake earned a bachelor’s degree in philosophy and was at UC Berkeley in the early 1930s for graduate mathematics but went to work in the financial sector.

In a prelude to scholarly life, Drake was for a time an administrator at the Government Development Bank in San Juan, Puerto Rico.

Drake received his first academic appointment in 1967 at the age of 57 as full professor at the University of Toronto after a  career as a financial administrator in the World Bank system. Although he had been recruited in the past by Harvard, he demurred in finance until he was attracted to Toronto by the offer made only to stars. During that time he had begun his studies of the works of Galileo and translated Galileo's Dialogue Concerning the Two Chief World Systems (1953), parts of four of Galileo's works in Discoveries and Opinions of Galileo (1957), and Galileo's The Assayer in The Controversy of Comets (1960), co-authored with C. D. O'Malley.

Possibly his most significant contribution to the history of science was his defense of Galileo's experiments as documented in his translation of Two New Sciences, chiefly in his footnotes.  Drake showed how the complex interaction of experimental measurement and mathematical analysis led Galileo to his law of falling bodies. His footnotes to Two New Sciences refute Alexandre Koyré's claim that experiment played no significant part in Galileo's thought by demonstration, for example in his models of Galileo's experiments which are described in his footnotes.

In 1980, Roger Hahn wrote that Drake was "probably the foremost authority on Galileo of our times".

In 1984 Drake was awarded the Galileo Galilei Prize for the Italian History of Science by the Italian Rotary Clubs. The jury was composed of Italian epistemologists and science historians.

In 1988 Drake was awarded the Sarton Medal by the History of Science Society.  He spent his entire academic career, beginning in 1967, at the University of Toronto's Institute for the History and Philosophy of Science and Technology.

Drake was reputedly "one of the greatest collectors of books and manuscripts of the twentieth century", and the books that he brought with him were housed at the university in what later became the Thomas Fisher Rare Book Library. Landon writes that "at a single stroke" his donation "transformed the strength and emphasis of the University Library and provided the basis for what has become one of the richest collections of early scientific works, from many countries and in many languages, in North America."

Personal life
Drake married twice.

Earlier in life, several years after receiving his bachelor's degree at the University of California at Berkeley (1932), Drake joined several college friends in creating the original version of a board game called Empire in 1938, which went on to inspire Peter Langston to create his computer game of the same name.

Selected works
(1949) Book of Anglo-Saxon Verse.
(1953) Dialogue Concerning the Two Chief World Systems. Berkeley: University of California Press.
(1957) Discoveries and Opinions of Galileo. New York: Doubleday & Company. 
(1973) "Galileo's Discovery of the Law of Free Fall," Scientific American 228(5): 84–92.
(1974) Two New Sciences, University of Wisconsin Press, 1974. . A new translation including sections on centers of gravity and the force of percussion.
(1978) Galileo At Work. Chicago: University of Chicago Press. 
(1982) Forming Book Collections, Toronto: The Amtmann Circle.
(1990) Galileo: Pioneer Scientist. Toronto: University of Toronto Press. . .

References

1910 births
1993 deaths
Historians of science
Philosophers of science
20th-century Canadian historians
Academic staff of the University of Toronto
University of California, Berkeley alumni